Rhys Llewelyn Norrington-Davies (born 22 April 1999) is a Welsh professional footballer who plays as a defender for Sheffield United and the Wales national team.

Early life
Norrington-Davies was born in Riyadh, Saudi Arabia to Welsh parents from Aberystwyth. His father, Patrick, was working in Saudi Arabia with the British Army. Due to the nature of his father's job, Norrington-Davies' family moved frequently during his childhood, spending time in Kenya, London, and in Aberystwyth, where he was educated at Ysgol Penglais, and Royal Russell School in Croydon, South London.

Club career
Norrington-Davies played at youth level for Bow Street, Aberystwyth Town, and Merstham. He played for Swansea City, before joining Sheffield United's academy in 2017. He joined Barrow on a one-month loan in September 2018, before the loan was extended to the end of the season in October. He moved on loan to Rochdale in July 2019 on a season-long loan.

Norrington-Davies joined Championship club Luton Town on a season-long loan on 3 September 2020. On 12 January 2021, he was recalled by Sheffield United after making 22 appearances in all competitions, and was loaned to Stoke City later that day. He played 20 times for Stoke, scoring once in a 2–0 win over Wycombe Wanderers on 6 March 2021.

International career
Norrington-Davies is a Wales under-19 and under-21 international. He was called up to the senior Wales squad for the first time in October 2020. He made his full international debut for Wales on 14 October 2020 in the starting line-up for the 1–0 Nations League win against Bulgaria.

In May 2021 he was selected to the Wales squad for the delayed UEFA Euro 2020 tournament.

He scored his first goal for Wales in their UEFA Nations League match against the Netherlands on 8 June 2022.

Career statistics

References

1999 births
Living people
Sportspeople from Riyadh
Welsh footballers
Wales youth international footballers
Wales under-21 international footballers
Wales international footballers
Bow Street F.C. players
Aberystwyth Town F.C. players
Merstham F.C. players
Swansea City A.F.C. players
Sheffield United F.C. players
Barrow A.F.C. players
Rochdale A.F.C. players
Luton Town F.C. players
Stoke City F.C. players
Association football defenders
English Football League players
National League (English football) players
UEFA Euro 2020 players
People educated at Royal Russell School
People educated at Ysgol Penglais School